WED, Wed, or wed may refer to:
 Wed, to get married in a wedding (e.g., "Jack wed Jill")
 Wednesday, abbreviated Wed.
 Walter Elias Disney
 Walt Disney Imagineering, originally named WED Enterprises
 Western Economic Diversification Canada, or WED, a Canadian government agency
 Where Eagles Dare (disambiguation)
 Willis-Ekbom disease, or WED, also known as restless legs syndrome
 World Environment Day, or WED